In the late 1930s, Seversky aircraft exported twenty two-seat 2PA-B3 to Japan for operational service by the Imperial Japanese Navy Air Service as the A8V1 Type S Two Seat Fighter.  The aircraft were imported as a result of Japanese anxiety over escalating losses for their unescorted strategic bombing raids with Type 96 G3M bombers deep into China from bases in Formosa (Taiwan) which had begun in 1937. The purchase contract for the Seversky 2PA-B3, construction numbers 122 through 141 had been negotiated secretly but was to cause controversy in the US and subsequent difficulties in Seversky's relationship with the US government and military. Sources differ on exactly when the aircraft were delivered, but it must have been at least prior to October 1938 (see below).

Design and development

The origins of the Seversky P-35 single-seat fighter trace back to the Seversky SEV-3 amphibian, which was developed into the Seversky BT-8 basic trainer.  Seversky's chief designer, Alexander Kartveli, also proposed a two-seat fighter derivative, the SEV-2XP. This was powered by a  Wright R-1670 radial engine. It had fixed landing gear in aerodynamic spats and was armed with one  and one  forward-firing machine guns plus an additional  machine gun for rear defence.

When the USAAC announced a competition for a new single-seat fighter in 1935, Seversky sent the SEV-2XP, confident it would win despite being a two-seater. However, the aircraft was damaged on 18 June 1935 during its transit to the fly-offs at Wright Field. The Air Corps delayed the fly-off until March 1936, which allowed Seversky time to rework the fighter into the single-seat SEV-1XP with retractable landing gear and re-engined with the Wright R-1820 radial.

In what proved to be an unpopular move for Seversky, twenty 2PA-B3s were sold to the Japanese Navy, which briefly employed them in the Second Sino-Japanese War as Navy Type S Two-Seat Fighter or A8V1 (Allied codename "Dick").

Two demonstrators ended up in the USSR; although a manufacturing licence was also bought, the Soviets undertook no production.

Sweden ordered 52 2PAs (known as the B 6), but only two were delivered before the remaining 50 were impounded in 1940 and put into service with the USAAC as the AT-12 Guardsman advanced trainer. On 18 June 1940, United States declared an embargo against exporting weapons to any nation other than the United Kingdom.

Operational history

The Seversky two-seat fighters were to be used as long-range escort aircraft with forward-firing guns and the observer equipped with a hand-held machine gun. However, when they arrived and were tested, the Japanese were disappointed with their performance, climb rate and agility in the air. There does not seem to be any record of them being used in the long-range bomber escort role for which they were intended, but instead they were relegated to a reconnaissance role over central China with the 12th Kōkūtai, operating from bases around Nanking. Possibly the successful development of the Zero-sen as a long-range fighter was also a factor in their demise. Unfortunately, little has been documented about their operational use over China.

Expecting to encounter these aircraft still in service, they were given the Allied reporting name "Dick", but by that time they had long been withdrawn from service.

Two of the aircraft were passed on to the Asahi Shimbun Newspaper company to become Shiokaze-go (汐風号, "Tide Wind", aircraft registration:J-BAAN) and Umikaze-go (海風号, "Sea Wind", aircraft registration:J-BAAQ), and a third was given to the Tokyo Nichi Nichi Shimbun Newspaper company.

Their planes used for interview and air transportation of manuscripts and photographs. J-BAAN was registered in October 1938 and J-BAAQ in March 1941, but a registration for the Tokyo Nichinichi Newspaper aircraft cannot be confirmed.

Variants
2PA
Two-seat version of Seversky P-35 with rear gunner.
2PA-202 - European demonstrator (1)
2PA-A - for USSR (1)
2PA-B - European demonstrator (1)
2PA-BX - European demonstrator (1)
2PA-B3 - 20 production aircraft for Imperial Japanese Navy Air Service as Seversky A8V1.
2PA-L - for USSR (1)
A8V1 "Dick"
Japanese designation for 2PA-B3 (and U.S. codename).
B 6
Swedish designation of the 2PA (only 2 delivered, see below).
AT-12 Guardsman
Two-seat advanced trainer for the USAAF (50 2PA ordered by Sweden, but impounded).

Operators

Imperial Japanese Navy Air Service

Swedish Air Force

United States Army Air Corps

Specifications (A8V1)

See also

References
Notes

Bibliography

 Davis Larry. P-35: Mini in Action (Mini Number 1). Carrollton, Texas: Squadron/Signal Publications, 1994. .
 Fitzsimmons, Bernard. The Illustrated International Aircraft Guide Fighters of WWII, Part IX. London: MacDonald Phoebus Ltd., 1981.
 Green, William. War Planes of the Second World War, Volume Four: Fighters. London: Macdonald & Co. (Publishers) Ltd., 1961 (Sixth impression 1969). .
 Hucker, Robert. "Seversky: Innovator and Prophet." Air Classics, 20th Anniversary Special Edition 1964-1984, 1984.
 United States Air Force Museum Guidebook. Wright-Patterson AFB, Ohio: Air Force Museum Foundation, 1975.

External links

 Seversky P-35 – National Museum of the United States Air Force
Information about all models and survivors of this series. Also information about new replicas to be built by VCS.

A08V
1930s Japanese fighter aircraft
Single-engined tractor aircraft
Low-wing aircraft